Miss Universe 1989, the 38th Miss Universe pageant, was held on 23 May 1989 at the Fiesta Americana Condesa Hotel in Cancún, Mexico. Angela Visser of the Netherlands was crowned by Porntip Nakhirunkanok of Thailand. Seventy-six contestants competed in this year.

Results

Placements

Final Competition

Contestants 

  – Luisa Norbis
  – Karina Felix
  – Karen Wenden
  – Bettina Berghold
  – Tasha Ramirez
  – Anne de Baetzelier
  – Andrea Sherman McKoy
  – Cornelia Furbert
  – Raquel Cors Ulloa
  – Flávia Cavalcanti
  – Viola Joseph
  – Juliette Powell
  – Carol Ann Balls
  – María Macarena Mina Garachena
  – María Teresa Egurrola Hinojosa
  – Luana Freer Bustamante
  – Anna Mosteiro
  – Louise Mejlhede
  – Anny Canaán Camido
  – María Eugenia Molina
  – Sally Attah
  – Beatriz López Rodríguez
  – Raquel Marie Jory
  – Åsa Maria Lövdahl
  – Pascale Meotti
  – Andrea Stelzer
  – Tatiana Desoisa
  – Kristiana Latani
  – Naja-Rie Sorensen
  – Janice Santos
  – Helka Cuevas
  – Glaphyra Jean-Louis
  – Frances Siryl Milla
  – Cynthia Yuk Lui Cheung
  – Guðbjörg Gissurardóttir
  – Dolly Minhas
  – Collette Jackson
  – Nicole Halperin
  – Christiana Bertasi
  – Sandra Foster
  – Eri Tashiro
  – Kim Sung-ryung
  – Chris Scott
  – Carmen Cheah Swee
  – Sylvana Sammut Pandolfino
  – Jacky Randabel
  – Adriana Abascal
  - Angela Visser
  – Shelley Soffe
  – Bianca Onoh
  – Soreen Villanueva
  – Lene Ornhoft
  – Ana Victoria Schaerer
  – Mariana Sovero
  – Sarah Jane Davis Paez
  – Joanna Gapińska
  – Anna Francisco Sobrinho
  – Catalina Villar
  – Chen Yen Ping
  – Victoria Susannah Lace
  – Pauline Chong
  – Eva Pedraza
  – Veronica Ruston
  – Camille Samuels
  – Consuela Cruden
  – Louise Drevenstam
  – Karina Berger
  – Yonlada Ronghanam
  – Guenevere Helen Keishall
  – Jasmine Baradan
  – Sharon Simons
  – Carolina Pies Riet
  – Gretchen Polhemus
  – Nathalie Lynch
  – Eva Lisa Larsdotter Ljung
  – Andrea Caroline Jones

Order of Introduction
This year marked the first year that introduced the contestants in regional groups in the Parade of Nations segment. The following table is the order of introduction in the Parade of Nations segment in the regional groups, randomly-ordered.

Notes

Debut
  competed for the first time as a sovereign state after gained independence from the United Kingdom in late 1979, even though the British territory of Saint Vincent had competed before in 1964, 1978 and 1979.

Returns
Last competed in 1979:
 

Last competed in 1982:
 

Last competed in 1985:
 
 

Last competed in 1986:
 
 

Last competed in 1987:

Replacement
  – Stephanie Zlotkowski was underage before February 1, so her first runner-up competed instead.
  - Michelle Reis withdrew due to her health issues at the time.

Awards
  – Miss Amity (Sharon Simons)
  – Miss Photogenic (Karen Wenden)
  – Best National Costume (Flavia Cavalcanti)

References
General

Specific references and notes

External links 
 Miss Universe official website

1989
1989 in Mexico
1989 beauty pageants
Beauty pageants in Mexico
Cancún
May 1989 events in Mexico